Šack is a village in Bielaruś, located in the Puchavicki rajon in the Minsk Voblast. As of 2012 its population was 697.

References

External links
 

Villages in Belarus
Holocaust locations in Belarus
Populated places in Puchavičy District